The National Informative Service, commonly known as SHIK, was an intelligence service agency created in 1991 by the Albanian People's Assembly. It was the successor to Sigurimi, the notorious secret service agency which repressed anti-communist dissent during the communist government of 1944–1991. The agency was succeed by SHISH in 1997.

Directors

See also 
 Sigurimi
 SHISH

References

Government agencies of Albania
Albanian intelligence agencies
 
Government agencies established in 1991
1991 establishments in Albania